Emotional.fr–Tornatech–GSC Blagnac VS31 is a women's professional cycling team initially based in France and then later in Canada that competes in elite road bicycle racing.

Team roster

Major results

2008
GP de Chambéry-le-Vieux, Sophie Creux
Ronde du Mont Pujols, Béatrice Thomas
Chambéry Criterium, Sophie Creux
Le Pré-Saint-Gervais, Béatrice Thomas
Cergy Criterium, Sandrine Bideau
Classic Féminine Vienne Poitou-Charentes, Leda Cox
2009
Stages 2 & 3 Tucson Bicycle Classic, Joëlle Numainville
Stage 4 Trophée d'Or Féminin, Béatrice Thomas
Stage 5 Trophée d'Or Féminin, Joëlle Numainville
2011
Kasseien Omloop Exloo, Christine Majerus
2013
Aguascalientes Team Pursuit, Stephanie Roorda
Aguascalientes Points race, Katarzyna Pawłowska
Guadalajara Team Pursuit (F) :  Stephanie Roorda 
Aguascalientes 3km Pursuit, Katarzyna Pawłowska
Stage 3 Tour de Bretagne, Katarzyna Pawłowska
Overall Tour Féminin en Limousin, Katarzyna Pawłowska 
Stages 3 & 4, Katarzyna Pawłowska
Prostějov Points race, Katarzyna Pawłowska
Pruszków Scratch, Katarzyna Pawłowska
Los Angeles Team Pursuit, Stephanie Roorda
2017
Jeux de la Francophonie Road Race, Pauline Allin

World, Continental & National Champions

2008
 Luxembourg Road Race, Christine Majerus 
2009
 Luxembourg Road Race, Christine Majerus 
 Canada U23 Road Race, Joëlle  Numainville
 Pan American Road Race, Joëlle  Numainville
2010
 Luxembourg Cyclo-cross, Christine Majerus 
 France Road Race Mélodie Lesueur 
 Luxembourg Time Trial, Christine Majerus 
 Luxembourg Road Race, Christine Majerus 
2011
 Luxembourg Cyclo-cross, Christine Majerus 
 Luxembourg Time Trial, Christine Majerus 
 Luxembourg Road Race, Christine Majerus 
2012
 Luxembourg Cyclo-cross, Christine Majerus 
 Luxembourg Time Trial, Christine Majerus 
 Luxembourg Road Race, Christine Majerus 
 Switzerland Time Trial, Patricia Schwager 
 Germany Track (Team pursuit), Lina-Kristin Schink 
2013
 World Track (Scratch race), Katarzyna Pawłowska 
 Poland Time Trial, Katarzyna Pawłowska 
 Poland Track (Individual pursuit), Katarzyna Pawłowska 
 Poland Track (Omnium), Katarzyna Pawłowska 
2017
 Costa Rica Time Trial, Milagro Mena
 Canada Cyclo-cross, Christel Ferrier-Bruneau
2022
 France U23 Time Trial, Célia Le Mouel

Former rosters
2017
Team members as of 1 October 2017.

References

External links

UCI Women's Teams
Cycling teams based in Canada
Cycling teams established in 2008